Yelkenli Island (literally "sailboat Island) is a Mediterranean island in Turkey.

The uninhabited island has an area of only . The island is almost merged to the mainland (Anatolia) and close to the Aydıncık Cave a famous cave. Yelkenli Island is known as a breeding location of Mediterranean gull and Mediterrean monk seal.

References

Islands of Mersin Province
Islands of Turkey
Aydıncık District (Mersin)
Mediterranean islands